The 1996 CONCACAF Cup Winners Cup was the fifth edition of this defunct tournament contended between 1991 and 1998.

Preliminary round

Northern Zone

Richmond Kickers qualified for interzonal playoff.

Caribbean Zone

Round 1

Round 2

Siroco qualified for interzonal playoff

Central Zone

Round 1

Round 2

Interzonal Playoff

Final Round
Tournament was abandoned.

References

2
CONCACAF Cup Winners Cup